The Highway to Hell Tour was a concert tour by Australian rock band AC/DC in support of the group's seventh studio album, Highway to Hell, which was released on 27 July 1979. The tour had 3 legs around Europe and North America lasting 5 months starting on 17 August 1979 at Haffmans Park in Bilzen, Belgium, and concluded on 27 January 1980 at Southampton, England. This was the last tour with Bon Scott, who died four weeks after the tour's completion.

Background
During the band's tour in the United States, the band attracted capacity crowds, with one venue having to turn away over two thousand fans after being sold out minutes after the box office opened. The band were set to tour in Japan and Australia in early 1980, but the legs were cancelled following the death of vocalist Bon Scott as a result of alcohol poisoning.

Def Leppard was the opening act for part of the European leg after they were approached by Peter Mensch of Leber-Krebs management, who had booked them on a tour of the UK supporting the band. During the shows in Texas in the United States, Riot and Molly Hatchet were the opening acts for the band on their North American leg.

Setlist

Europe (warm–up leg)
"Live Wire"
"Problem Child"
"Walk All Over You"
"Shot Down in Flames"
"Bad Boy Boogie"
"The Jack"
"Highway to Hell"
"Whole Lotta Rosie"
"Rocker"
Encore
 "Let There Be Rock"

North America
"Live Wire"
"Shot Down in Flames"
"Walk All Over You"
"Hell Ain't a Bad Place to Be"
"Sin City"
"Problem Child"
"Bad Boy Boogie"
"The Jack"
"Highway to Hell"
"High Voltage"
"Whole Lotta Rosie"
"Rocker"

Encore
 "If You Want Blood You've Got It"
"Let There Be Rock"

Europe
"Live Wire"
"Shot Down in Flames"
"Hell Ain't a Bad Place to Be"
"Sin City"
"Walk All Over You" 
"Bad Boy Boogie"
"The Jack"
"Highway to Hell"
"High Voltage"
"Girls Got Rhythm"
"Whole Lotta Rosie"
"Rocker"

Encore
"T.N.T." or "If You Want Blood (You Got It)"
"Let There Be Rock"

Tour dates

Cancelled dates

Box office score data

Personnel
Bon Scott – lead vocals
Angus Young – lead guitar
Malcolm Young – rhythm guitar, backing vocals
Cliff Williams – bass guitar, backing vocals
Phil Rudd – drums

Notes

References

Citations

Sources

 
 
 
 
 
 

AC/DC concert tours
1979 concert tours
1980 concert tours